The UK Debt Management Office (DMO) is the executive agency responsible for debt and cash management for the UK Government, lending to local authorities and managing certain public sector funds.

Purpose

The DMO is responsible for day-to-day management of the UK Government's debt.  It is tasked with carrying out the UK Government's debt management policy of minimising financing costs over the long term, taking account of risk, and managing the aggregate cash needs of the Exchequer in the most cost-effective way, in both cases consistently with the objectives of monetary and any wider policy considerations.

It also manages the Public Works Loan Board and the Commissioners for the Reduction of the National Debt.

Legal responsibility

In institutional terms, the DMO is legally and constitutionally part of HM Treasury as an executive agency. The Minister ultimately responsible for the DMO is the Chancellor of the Exchequer, who determines the policy and financial framework within which the DMO operates, but delegates to the Chief Executive operational decisions on debt and cash management, and day-to-day management of the office.

History

The DMO was established on 1 April 1998 when responsibility for government wholesale sterling debt issuance was transferred from the Bank of England to the DMO. This re-organisation followed the transfer of operational responsibility for setting official UK interest rates from HM Treasury to the Bank of England in May 1997.

References

External links

7th IMF Debt Management Forum, Brian Olden, IMF/FAD

United Kingdom national debt
Organisations based in the City of London
Executive agencies of the United Kingdom government
1998 establishments in the United Kingdom